Leslie Walker (born in the 1950s) is an author, journalist and college professor who lives in Maryland.

Walker currently is the Knight Visiting Professor in Digital Innovation at the University of Maryland's Philip Merrill College of Journalism. She teaches courses in multimedia journalism, citizen journalism and social media.

From 1991 until 2007, Walker worked for The Washington Post as an editor, columnist and reporter. Her jobs there included a stint as executive editor of Washingtonpost.com and vice president for news at Washingtonpost.Newsweek Interactive. While at the Washington Post, she created and wrote a column about the impact of the Internet on society, business and culture called ".com." It ran in the Post for eight years and was widely republished in other newspapers.

Walker is the author of Sudden Fury: A True Story of Adoption and Murder, a bestselling work of literary nonfiction about a double murder, published by St. Martin's Press. It was made into a television movie starring Neil Patrick Harris and Johnny Galecki in 1993, and released on DVD in 2006.

Sources 
 Walker's .com column archive in The Washington Post
 University of Maryland announcement of Walker's hire, 2008
 Sudden Fury movie/book synopsis and credits from Variety
 Walker's faculty page at the University of Maryland

Living people
American newspaper reporters and correspondents
Writers from Maryland
The Washington Post people
20th-century American non-fiction writers
21st-century American non-fiction writers
21st-century American women writers
20th-century American women writers
American women non-fiction writers
Year of birth missing (living people)